James David may refer to:

 James David ( Film Director ), Entrepreneur, Filmmaker and writer 
 James Burty David (1946–2009), Mauritian politician
 Jim David (American football) (1927–2007), American football player
 Jim David, American stand-up comedian, actor and writer

See also
 David James (disambiguation)